The geology of Rwanda comprises Mesoproterozoic metasediments, largely quartzites, sandstones, and shales of the Burundian Supergroup which are locally intruded by granite. There are four types of granite in the Kibaran Belt. In eastern Rwanda are the “older granites” along with granitic-gneisses and migmatites of Palaeoproterozoic age.  In the northwest and southwest are Neogene volcanics, ranging in age from Cenozoic to recent. Some of the volcanoes in the area are highly alkaline. Alluvium and lake sediments of Quaternary age occur in parts of the Western Rift and along rivers and lakes.

Geohazards 

Toxic gas emitted from the Virunga volcanoes have been noted.

Economic geology
A significant portion of Rwanda's economy is based on mineral extraction. Rwanda is the foremost producer of tungsten in Africa, producing 70% of Africa's total output. Rwanda is Africa's second highest producer of tin and coltan, accounting for 20%  and 30% of the country's output, respectively. Rwanda also produces 9% of the world's tantalum. Rwanda produces gemstones. Even though a substantial portion of the country's economy is based on mineral extraction, Rwanda has in the past shut down mineral extraction due to environmental concerns.

Prior to 2006, natural gas was extracted from Lake Kivu. A disagreement between the oil company and the Government of Rwanda has suspended operations. In this region, reserves of helium rich methane is estimated to be 56.65 billion m3. Although petroleum extraction occurs in the country, it imports more than it exports.

References